Post Mortem (stylized in all caps) is the debut studio album by Argentine rapper and singer Dillom. It was released on 1 December 2021 by his own record label, Bohemian Groove. Production for the album is handled by Fermín Ugarte, Ramón Evar Peaguda, Luis Tomás La Madrid and Dillom himself. Post Mortem received widespread acclaim from music journalists, and was placed on several year-end critics' lists. The album spawned four singles: "Opa", "Piso 13", "Pelotuda" and "Rocketpowers". The Post Mortem Tour kicked off in February 2022.

Post Mortem received three nominations at the 2022 Premios Gardel, including Best Urban Music Album.

Background and composition  

Dillom rose to fame in 2018 with the self-produced track "Dripping" and founded the creative team Rip Gang, alongside fellow musicians Ill Quentín, Muerejoven, Odd Mami, Taichu and Saramalacara. In 2019, he became one of the most prominent figures in "the new wave of Argentine trap" with a lauded performance at Buenos Aires Trap Festival and a much-discussed collaboration with producer and DJ Bizarrap. In 2020, Dillom founded his own record label, Bohemian Groove, and released his most successful solo single to date, "Dudade". In 2021, he was featured on L-Gante's "Tinty Nasty" and announced that we would release his debut album later in the year.

Dillom worked on Post Mortem for two years and described the process as "challenging" and "exhausting". During an interview with TN, he said that what inspired him to make the album was his "fear of death"; "There were many great things happening in my life and suddenly I was afraid of dying [...] I think the only way towards immortality is through art so I made an album with what I want to be left from me if I die." Post Mortem was produced by Fermín Ugarte, Ramón Evar Peaguda, Luis Tomás La Madrid and Dillom himself, and was recorded at Estudio El Árbol in Buenos Aires and Estudio Sonorámica in Córdoba.

Music and lyrics 

Post Mortem was described as an "eclectic" mix of hip hop, horrorcore, pop and rock, with elements of industrial, experimental and trap. Consisting of 18 tracks, it is a concept album about "overcoming the fear of death" and addresses topics such as his childhood, family, love, fame and existentialism. Dillom expressed he wanted the album to be an "instant classic", aiming for an "iconic, timeless" production.

Post Mortem opens with "La Primera", a ballad noted for "[having] some of the most beautiful lines on the album". A music video directed by Santiago Chaher and Noduermo portrays Dillom's troubled childhood and "a tragic ending". Dillom described the video as "special". The second track, "Hegemónica", features L-Gante and was labeled as RKT, an Argentine music genre that combines cumbia villera and reggaeton. "Pelotuda" was noted for adapting American slang into Spanish and was compared to rapper Eminem. A music video was directed by Noduermo. The following track, "Demian", is a spoken-word interlude featuring Argentine journalist Mario Pergolini. It is a "horror story" depicting fictional character Demian's "strange transformation in the middle of the forest". It leads into the title track, in which Demian kills his friends. Musically, it was described as "cyber-pop". Sixth track "Bicicleta" "flirts with pop and dance music".

"Duo" is an instrumental interlude that leads to "Piso 13", an alternative hip hop and industrial piece. Its lyrics were described as "sharp" and "packed with Argentine culture references". A "dense, dark" music video was directed by Noduermo. This part of the album was described as the "darkest", with ninth track "Side" noted for its personal lyrics, touching upon themes such as his mother. Fellow Rip Gang member Muerejoven is featured on "Coach", a trap song described as a "more straightforward rapper [type of] track". "Bohemian Groove Skit", another spoken-word interlude, is a parodic radio advertisement for Dillom's own record label, Bohemian Groove. Lead single "Opa" features flutes and was described as "one of the most accomplished tracks [in urban music] of recent times." A music video directed by Noduermo was inspired by Tyler, the Creator, Eminem and the 2000s. "Rili Rili" is a rap rock song, while "220" features a "soft" indie pop sound. "220" is Dillom's favorite song on the album, describing it as "introspective" and praising himself for "being able to face what [he feels] with no shame".

The album's final section opens with "Toda la Gente", a choir and piano interlude reminiscent of 80s Argentine rock, most notably Fito Páez. "Reality" was compared to Marilyn Manson, while "Rocketpowers", featuring Rip Gang member Saramalacara, was described as a "fun", blink-182-influenced post-punk track. Post Mortem closes with "Amigos Nuevos", a "vulnerable" ballad which Dillom described as "hard to write".

Artwork 
 
The artwork for Post Mortem was made by Argentine painters Marcelo Canevari and Ornella Pocetti. Dillom personally wanted "characters that were innocent, child-like, with a darker twist", which was similar to Canevari and Pocetti's usual work. The ghost featured in the cover can be found in most of Canevari's paintings. The artwork was first made digitally and then painted on actual canvas and has an aspect ratio of 10:11.

Indie Hoy praised the cover as "disturbing and fascinating" and described it as a "visual fable where Dillom is at the center of a spiritual session surrounded by ghosts and creatures creeping on the musician". They also argued that the "dead animals could simbolize the death of innocence" and the "catastrophic" landscape was connected to the "life episodes narrated throughout the album". Visual arts magazine Ramona compared the artwork to Meditations on a Hobby Horse (1963) by British art historian Ernst Gombrich.

In June 2022, Dillom expressed his disappointment over Post Mortem not receiving a nomination for Best Album Cover at the 2022 Premios Gardel. Canevari himself said he "would've liked a nomination", although he "understands they nominate a different type of artwork".

The original painting can be found in Dillom's office at Bohemian Groove, his own record company.

Reception 

Post Mortem received widespread acclaim upon release. Malena Sabanes Niccolini from El Destape praised the album and called it "one of the best of the year", while Buenos Aires platform enAgenda lauded Dillom as "the scene's most original artist". Lucas Santomero from Indie Hoy described Post Mortem as "complete, overwhelming and, for some, unexpected [...] Much bigger than a simple trap record". Filo.news also lauded the album as one of the year's best. Writing for La Izquierda Diario, Josefina García called it "an unprecedented phenomenon" and praised its concept, cohesiveness and sound. Juan Villain from The Medizine pointed out the album's mixture of music genres and styles as its "greatest achievement".

The music video for "Piso 13" received two nominations at the 2021 Buenos Aires Music Video Festival Awards, including Best Art Direction.

Post Mortem received two nominations at the 2022 Premios Gardel for Best Urban Music Album and Best Newcomer. "Opa" received one nomination for Best Urban Music Song.

As of January 2023, Post Mortem amassed over 130 million streams on Spotify.

Year-end lists

The Post Mortem Tour 

Dillom announced he would tour Argentina, Latin America and Europe to support the album. The Post Mortem Tour kicked off on February 13, 2022, at Cosquín Rock Festival in Córdoba. Tickets for the shows at Teatro Vorterix sold out in less than 4 minutes.

The Post Mortem Tour received positive feedback from both critics and fans. The gigs at Cosquín Rock Festival and Lollapalooza were lauded as "consecrating". El Planteo described the show as "detailed" and "comprehensive".

Track listing 
All songs written and produced by Dillom, Fermín Ugarte, Ramón Evar Peaguda and Luis Tomás La Madrid, unless noted otherwise. All songs stylized in all caps.

Credits and personnel 

 Dillom – vocals, songwriting, production
 Fermín Ugarte – songwriting, production
 Luis Tomás La Madrid – songwriting, production
 Ramón Evar Peaguda – songwriting, production
 Santiago de Simone – mixing
 Mike Bozzi – mastering
 L-Gante – vocals, songwriting
 Mario Pergolini – vocals
 Muerejoven – vocals, songwriting
 Saramalacara – vocals, songwriting
 Marcelo Canevari – artwork design
 Ornella Pocetti – artwork design
 Noduermo – music video direction
 Santiago Chaher – music video direction

References 

2021 debut albums
Spanish-language albums